The 2019–20 Serbian SuperLiga (known as the Linglong Tire SuperLiga for sponsorship reasons) is the fourteenth season of the Serbian SuperLiga since its establishment. Red Star was the defending champions from the previous season.

Season was suspended on 15 March 2020, as a result of COVID-19 pandemic and declaring state of emergency, and was resumed on 29 May 2020. The season was shortened and the play-offs (championship round and relegation round) were cancelled, and no teams would be relegated.

Teams

The league consisted of 16 teams: thirteen teams from the 2018–19 Serbian SuperLiga and three new teams from the 2018–19 Serbian First League, TSC, Javor, and Inđija.

Venues

Personnel and kits

Note: Flags indicate national team as has been defined under FIFA eligibility rules. Players and Managers may hold more than one non-FIFA nationality.

Nike is the official ball supplier for Serbian SuperLiga.

Kelme is the official sponsor of the Referee's Committee of the Football Association of Serbia.

Transfers
For the list of transfers involving SuperLiga clubs during 2019–20 season, please see: List of Serbian football transfers summer 2019 and List of Serbian football transfers winter 2019–20.

Regular season

League table

Results

Individual statistics

Top goalscorers
As of matches played on 19 June 2020.

Hat-tricks

Player of the week
As of matches played on 20 June 2020.

References

External links
 
 UEFA

Serbia
Serbian SuperLiga seasons
2019–20 in Serbian football leagues
Serbian